Archibald Hoxsey (October 15, 1884 – December 31, 1910) was an American aviator who worked for the Wright brothers.

Biography
Hoxsey was born in Staunton, Illinois, on October 15, 1884. He moved with his parents to Pasadena, California. In his early twenties he worked as an auto mechanic and chauffeur. By 1909-1910 his  mechanical ability led to a meeting with the Wright Brothers. In March 1910 the Wright brothers opened a flight school in Montgomery, Alabama, and Hoxsey was a teacher there. There he became the first pilot to fly at night.

On October 11, 1910, at Kinloch Field in St. Louis he took Theodore Roosevelt up in an airplane.

Because of their dueling altitude record attempts, he and Ralph Johnstone were nicknamed the "heavenly twins".

Hoxsey was to participate in the 22nd annual Tournament of Roses Parade, on January 2, 1911, sitting upon a float replica of the plane he set the flight altitude record in.

Death

Hoxsey died on December 31, 1910, in Los Angeles, California, after crashing from  while trying to set a new altitude record. The Wright Brothers paid for the funeral. Contemporary sources, including Roy Knabenshue, blamed his death on "mountain sickness".

He is buried in Woodlawn Cemetery, Atkinson, Nebraska, in the same grave as his father, Archibald Hoxsey Sr.

References

External links

Archibald Hoxsey bibliography
Early Aviators: Archibald Hoxsey
North Dakota first flight; transcript of July 19 2006 radio broadcast
Video of flight with Theodore Roosevelt in 1910
Photo of Arch Hoxsey & President Roosevelt seated in Wright Flyer prior to their flight
 various photos, some rare, of the flight with Teddy

Further reading
The New York Times, August 20, 1910: Airmen Play Tag With Moonbeams; Hoxsey And Johnstone Unexpectedly Make Two Night Flights At Asbury Park. Asbury Park, New Jersey, August 19, 1910. With no one to watch them save the night birds and a few invited friends. Arch Hoxsey and Ralph Johnstone, the young Wright airmen, winged their way up among the moonbeams between 10:00 and 10:30 o'clock tonight.
The New York Times, October 9, 1910: Flight Of 104 Miles Is Made By Hoxsey; In Wright Biplane He Goes From Springfield To St. Louis With A Detour. St. Louis, Missouri; October 8, 1910. After making the longest continuous aeroplane flight recorded in America, Arch Hoxsey, who soared aloft in a Wright biplane at Springfield, Illinois, at 11:56 this morning, landed upon the lawn of the St. Louis Country Club shortly before 3 o'clock this afternoon, Although the distance to St. Louis from Springfield is only 88 miles, Hoxsey made a detour that brought his continued flight up to 104 miles.
The New York Times, Sunday, January 1, 1911: Wrights Deplore Hoxsey. He Was One Of The Most Promising And Intrepid Of Aviators, They Say. Dayton, Ohio; December 31, 1910. The announcement of the death of Arch Hoxsey at Los Angeles today came as a terrible shock to Wilbur and Orville Wright, but they emphatically declared that they did not care to discuss the accident until they had heard further details and had received a statement of the conditions under which it occurred from some experienced aviator who witnessed it.
Time, Monday, June 11, 1928: Theodore Roosevelt seated in a plane which was of the "pusher" type: Beneath the picture is the following notation: "Colonel Roosevelt in a Wright Aeroplane at St. Louis. Archibald Hoxsey, who carried the Colonel twice around the Park, a distance of 4½ miles, is seen talking to Mr. Roosevelt, who was most enthusiastic over his experience, declaring he never felt a bit of fear. This picture shows the Colonel as he took his seat. Before starting he took off his hat and put on a cap."
John H. Zobel, Stardust Falling: Arch Hoxsey and Ralph Johnstone. In AAHS Journal, Volume 61, Number 2, Summer 2016, pages 89–99.

1884 births
1910 deaths
Wright brothers
Aviators killed in aviation accidents or incidents in the United States
People from Staunton, Illinois
Accidental deaths in California
Aviation in North Dakota
Flight altitude record holders
Members of the Early Birds of Aviation
American aviation record holders
Victims of aviation accidents or incidents in 1910